The Zamboanga Family's Brand Sardines, formerly the Zamboanga-Family's Brand Sardines Valientes, are a professional basketball team in the Maharlika Pilipinas Basketball League. Its name is due to sponsorship with Universal Canning Inc. which owns the canned sardines brand, Family's Atami Brand Sardines.

History

MPBL
The team first joined the Maharlika Pilipinas Basketball League (MPBL) as the Zamboanga–Family's Brand Sardines Valientes in the 2018–19 MPBL season. The team was reportedly "relaunched" as the Zamboanga Family's Brand Sardines starting the 2019–20 season following undisclosed management issues. After its participation in the 2019–20 season which was postponed mid-season to 2021 due to the COVID-19 pandemic, Zamboanga announced that it would not participate in the succeeding season and would decide on their status in the MPBL by 2022. The team returned to the league in 2022, which marked its most successful season in the league. Led by season MVP Jaycee Marcelino, Zamboanga clinched the top seed of the MPBL South Division, and booked its first MPBL Finals appearance by beating the Batangas City Embassy Chill in the South Division Finals. In the 2022 MPBL Finals, Zamboanga lost to the Nueva Ecija Rice Vanguards in four games.

Chooks to Go Pilipinas 3x3
Family's Brand Sardines joined the Chooks-to-Go Pilipinas 3x3, debuting in the 2020-21 season. For the President's Cup, they fielded a roster filled with national 3x3 players; Joshua Munzon, Alvin Pasaol, Troy Rike, Santi Santillan. The decision was made as part of the preparation of the Philippine national team for their participation in the Olympic Qualifying Tournament (OQT) for the 2020 Summer Olympics. The team won the President's Cup title, winning four of five legs including the Grand Final.

FIBA 3x3 World Tour
As winners of the 2020 President's Cup of Chooks-to-Go Pilipinas 3x3, Zamboanga earned the right to play in the 2020 Fiba 3x3 World Tour Doha Masters. The team will play as "Manila Chooks" and will have to earn at least a fourth place finish to qualify for the 3x3 World Tour Jeddah Final.

Current roster

Head coaches

MPBL records

References

2018 establishments in the Philippines
Basketball teams established in 2018
Maharlika Pilipinas Basketball League teams
Chooks-to-Go Pilipinas 3x3 teams